Francis Lloyd may refer to:

Francis Lloyd (British Army officer) (1853–1926)
Francis Lloyd (Royalist) (died 1669), Welsh politician
Francis Ernest Lloyd (1868–1947), American botanist
Francis Lloyd (priest) (died 1712), Welsh Anglican priest
Francis Lloyd (died 1799), MP for Montgomeryshire

See also
Frank Lloyd (disambiguation)